Samut Sakhon may refer to
the town Samut Sakhon
Samut Sakhon Province
Mueang Samut Sakhon district